João Miguel e Melo de Oliveira (born 13 September 1998) is a Portuguese footballer who plays for Amora as a forward.

Football career
He made his professional debut for Estoril on 28 December 2019 in the LigaPro.

References

External links

1998 births
Sportspeople from Setúbal
Living people
Portuguese footballers
Association football forwards
Real S.C. players
G.D. Estoril Praia players
S.C. Olhanense players
Floridsdorfer AC players
S.C.U. Torreense players
Amora F.C. players
Campeonato de Portugal (league) players
Liga Portugal 2 players
2. Liga (Austria) players
Portuguese expatriate footballers
Expatriate footballers in Austria
Portuguese expatriate sportspeople in Austria